The zh sound has many different pronunciations in different languages.

Language
 Zh (digraph),  a digraph in some languages, such as Albanian, Uyghur (Uyghur Latin script) and Chinese (pinyin)
 Ž, a letter in the Latin script
 Zhe (Cyrillic) (Ж), a letter of the Cyrillic alphabet
 Ezh (ʒ), a letter sometimes represented by the digraph "zh"
 Voiced postalveolar fricative, a sound represented by this letter in IPA (or the digraph "zh")
 Chinese language (ISO 639-1 code: zh), based on a native name of the Chinese language Zhōngwén and a Chinese adjective for Chinese, Zhōnghuá
Tamil language based on letter 'ழ'   in Tamil .This letter is used since sangam letrature of Tamizh.

Places
 Canton of Zürich, Switzerland
 South Holland (Zuid-Holland), a province in the Netherlands
 Zhuhai, China
Tamil Nadu India, and also in Sri Lanka, Singapore.

Other uses
 Shenzhen Airlines (IATA airline designator)
 Zero Hedge, a financial blog started in 2009 by a group of Wall Street traders
 Zettahenry (ZH), an SI unit of inductance